Haji Amir Wright (born March 27, 1998) is an American professional soccer player who plays for Süper Lig club Antalyaspor and the United States national team.

After making his professional debut with the New York Cosmos in 2015, he spent most of his career in Europe, with Schalke 04 in the German Bundesliga, VVV-Venlo in the Dutch Eredivisie, SønderjyskE in the Danish Superliga and Antalyaspor in the Turkish Süper Lig.

Wright made his senior debut for the United States national team in 2022 and played at the 2022 FIFA World Cup.

Youth soccer
Known for his finishing, ability to win headers, and quickness, Wright had been dubbed by many media outlets as one of the top prospects in the United States youth system. His success with the under-17 national team prompted him to train with Schalke 04's academy.

Professional career

New York Cosmos 
In March 2015, Wright officially signed with NASL club New York Cosmos for an undisclosed fee and contract length. He made his professional debut on May 27 in the third round of the U.S. Open Cup, as a 79th-minute substitute for Sebastián Guenzatti in a 3–0 home win over the Jersey Express, and then played three league games for a total of 80 minutes, starting with the game versus Indy Eleven on July 26. Wright's contract expired following the season, and he did not re-sign.

Schalke 04 
In April 2016, Wright signed with Schalke 04. In his debut with the Schalke under-19 team on April 16, Wright scored a brace against Borussia Mönchengladbach U19.

Wright was promoted to the Schalke first team in May 2017. He was named on the bench against FC Ingolstadt 04 on May 20, 2017. In July 2018, Wright underwent a trial period with 2. Bundesliga club Union Berlin. On November 24, 2018, Wright made his debut for Schalke first team when he replaced Steven Skrzybski in the 88th minute of the 5–2 win against 1. FC Nürnberg. He played seven games for the team from Gelsenkirchen, all in the league, and scored a consolation goal in a 2–1 home loss to Bayer 04 Leverkusen on December 19; the goal was assisted by compatriot Weston McKennie.

VVV-Venlo 
In July 2019, Wright joined VVV-Venlo on a free transfer. He played 22 Eredivisie games without scoring, but scored in the first round of the KNVB Cup on October 30; coming on in the last minute, he tied the game at 2–2 at fourth-tier RKSV Groene Ster, but missed the decisive attempt in a penalty shootout defeat.

SønderjyskE 
In August 2020, Wright joined SønderjyskE on a free transfer. He got off to a strong start in the league, with 6 goals in 8 appearances by early November, and his performances led to him being named as the Danish Superliga Player of the Month for October 2020. 

In July 2021, Wright wanted to move on from SønderjyskE and failed to report back for pre-season training. On July 21, Turkish club Antalyaspor confirmed that they had signed Wright on loan from SønderjyskE with an option to buy. However, later on the same day, SønderjyskE went out and denied that the deal had gone through because they had not yet received any payment. However, on July 28, SønderjyskE confirmed that he had been loaned out to Antalyaspor for the 2021–22 season and also signed a new deal with Sønderjyske until June 2024.

Antalyaspor 
Wright opened his account for Antalyaspor in his third game on August 28, 2021 in which he scored a hat-trick in a 3–2 home win over Çaykur Rizespor, concluding with a penalty kick in the tenth minute of added time. He scored 14 goals in 31 games in the 2021–22 Süper Lig, including eight over seven consecutive games, and nine in the last ten games. He was then tracked by EFL Championship club Hull City and their manager Shota Arveladze.

On July 19, 2022, Wright signed a three-year deal.

International career

Wright is of Liberian and Ghanaian descent. He has represented the United States at all youth levels. In May 2022, Wright was called into the United States senior camp by Gregg Berhalter for a CONCACAF Nation's League window.

Wright scored his first international goal on his senior debut for the United States on June 1, 2022, in a 3–0 friendly victory against Morocco. In November 2022, Wright was named to the squad for the 2022 FIFA World Cup. In the 3–1 last-16 elimination by the Netherlands, he scored the American goal.

Personal life
Haji's brother Hanif played on the under-19 team of Bonner SC in 2017. Haji's cousins are also active in athletics: Joseph Putu played cornerback for the Florida Gators, his second cousin, Isaac Nana Addai, played for the Liberia national under-23 team as well as Boston City FC, and his third cousin, Joseph Addai, won Super Bowl XLI in 2007 with the Indianapolis Colts.

Career statistics

Club

International

Scores and results list the United States' goal tally first.

Honors
New York Cosmos
North American Soccer League: 2015

Individual
Superliga Player of the Month: October 2020

References

1998 births
Living people
American soccer players
United States men's under-23 international soccer players
United States men's youth international soccer players
United States men's international soccer players
American people of Liberian descent
American people of Ghanaian descent
American expatriate soccer players
Association football forwards
New York Cosmos (2010) players
Soccer players from Los Angeles
North American Soccer League players
FC Schalke 04 players
FC Schalke 04 II players
SV Sandhausen players
VVV-Venlo players
SønderjyskE Fodbold players
Antalyaspor footballers
Bundesliga players
2. Bundesliga players
Eredivisie players
Süper Lig players
2022 FIFA World Cup players
American expatriate soccer players in Germany
American expatriate sportspeople in the Netherlands
American expatriate sportspeople in Denmark
American expatriate sportspeople in Turkey
Expatriate footballers in Germany
Expatriate footballers in the Netherlands
Expatriate men's footballers in Denmark
Expatriate footballers in Turkey